Sindre Marthinsen Kulset (born 7 August 1998) is a Norwegian cyclist, who currently rides for UCI ProTeam .

His brother Kristian is also a professional cyclist on the same team.

Major results
2022
 2nd Grand Prix Alanya

References

External links

1998 births
Living people
Norwegian male cyclists
Cyclists from Oslo